Krishna Kumar Rai is a member of 2nd Nepalese Constituent Assembly. He won Sunsari–1 seat in 2013 Nepalese Constituent Assembly election from Communist Party of Nepal (Unified Marxist-Leninist).

References

Year of birth missing (living people)
Communist Party of Nepal (Unified Marxist–Leninist) politicians
Living people
Members of the 2nd Nepalese Constituent Assembly
Members of the Provincial Assembly of Koshi Province